The 65th Nations Cup in roller hockey was the 2013 edition of the Nations Cup. 
The competition was hosted as normal in Montreux from 27 to 31 March 2013.
Portugal won its 17th trophy, the third consecutive and the respective Marcel Monney Award.

Group stage

Group A

Group B

Final Phase

5th-8th places

Champion

Semifinals

Final

Final ranking

External links
 Official website

References

Nations Cup (roller hockey)
N
Sport in Montreux
Nations Cup
Nations Cup
Nations Cup